The Port de Pailhères  (or Col de Pailhères) (elevation ) is a mountain pass in the Ariège department of the French Pyrenees, located on the secondary road D25 between Mijanès (south-east) and Ax-les-Thermes (west).

Details of climb

Tour de France
The climb has been used in five stages of the Tour de France cycle race with its first appearance coming in 2003. In 2013, it was used on the eighth stage, when the riders also competed for the Souvenir Henri Desgrange.

Appearances in Tour de France

References

External links

Profile/Photos/Video: Cycling Ax-les-Thermes and Port de Pailheres
Port de Pailhères on Google Maps (Tour de France classic climbs)

Mountain passes of Ariège (department)
Mountain passes of the Pyrenees